Dario Trutmann (born September 17, 1992) is a Swiss professional ice hockey defenceman who is currently playing with the ZSC Lions of the National League (NL).

Trutmann made his National League A debut playing with EHC Biel during the 2012–13 NLA season. After four seasons with Lausanne HC Trutmann left the club as a free agent having earlier signed a two-year contract with his fourth NL club, ZSC Lions, on 16 January 2019. On February 17, 2021, Trutmann agreed to an early three-year contract extension with the Lions through to the end of the 2023/24 season.

References

External links

1992 births
Living people
EHC Biel players
GCK Lions players
Genève-Servette HC players
SC Langenthal players
Lausanne HC players
Plymouth Whalers players
Swiss ice hockey defencemen
People from Zug
Sportspeople from the canton of Zug
ZSC Lions players